was a Japanese daimyō of the early Edo period, who ruled the Tsuwano Domain. He assisted in the construction of a part of Kōdaiji Temple in Kyoto. Hsi childhood name was Dairiki (大力).

Family
 Father: Kamei Masanori
 Mother: Kōmyōin
 Wife: Tōsen-in
 Concubine: Mizusaki Hōan’s daughter
 Children:
 Kamei Masanao (1645-1679) by Tōsen-in
 Kamei Koretsugu
 daughter married Matsudaira Yasutomi
 daughter married Shimazu Tadataka
 daughter married Namba Munekazu
 daughter married Washo Masatoki
 Kamei Korechika (1669-1731) by Mizusaki Hōan’s daughter
 Kamei Masasuke
 Munekiyo Sōjō
 Tago Masazumi
 daughter married Morikawa Toshitane
 daughter married Itakura Shigehiro
 daughter married Yagyū Toshikata
 Kamei Noriyuki

References
 "Goryoeshi shiseki" on bakumatu.727.net (18 February 2008)

Daimyo
1617 births
1681 deaths
Kamei clan